Nello Lauredi (5 October 1924 in Mulazzo, Italy – 8 April 2001 in Saint-Laurent-du-Var, France) was a professional French road bicycle racer. He was of Italian origin but in 1948 he changed nationality to France. He was a professional cyclist from 1949 until 1959 and had 17 wins. His most important win being three overall wins in the  Dauphiné Libéré. Other wins included a stage in the 1950 Tour de France and in the 1952 Tour de France where he also wore the yellow jersey for 4 days.

Major results

1950
Critérium du Dauphiné Libéré
Tour de France:
Winner stage 7
1951
Critérium du Dauphiné Libéré
1952
Paris-Limoges
Tour de France:
Winner stage 3
Wearing yellow jersey for four days
1953
Tour de France:
Winner stage 13
8th place overall classification
1954
Critérium du Dauphiné Libéré
1956
Tour de France:
7th place overall classification
1958
Moulins-Englibert

External links

French male cyclists
French Tour de France stage winners
1924 births
2001 deaths
Sportspeople from the Province of Massa-Carrara
Italian emigrants to France
Cyclists from Tuscany
People from Mulazzo